Kesun may refer to:
 an alternative spelling for the Fortress of Kaysun, a fortress located near the town of Çakırhüyük in the Adıyaman Province in Turkey
Çakırhüyük, Besni in Turkey, formerly called K'esun
 Kesun (annelid), a worm genus in the family Opheliidae